The Hermann Wesselink College is a secondary school in Amstelveen, The Netherlands .

The school is named after Hermann Wesselink, a school principal who died at an early age, soon after retirement. The motto of the school is; "A school where everybody is equal but nobody is the same". In 2022 the school has 1866 students. The school offers vmbo, havo, vwo (atheneum and gymnasium), and in recent years bilingual education (IB Diploma in English at A2 level).

According to the "onderwijsinspectie", the Dutch school inspection, the results are what could be expected from these students.

External links 
 The website of the school in Dutch
 Reports of the inspectors, in Dutch 

Secondary schools in the Netherlands
Amstelveen